The 2023 Toronto FC season is the 17th season in the history of Toronto FC.

Squad
As of March 14, 2023

Roster slots 
Toronto currently has 6+3 international roster slots and three Designated Player slots available for use in the 2022 season. Beginning in 2022, MLS added three non-tradeable international roster spots to the Canadian franchises to compensate for the more complicated residency requirements compared to in the United States; players occupying these additional roster spots are required to have played and been registered with a Canadian MLS club for at least one full year. In 2022, they traded a 2023 international roster spot along with a 2023 MLS SuperDraft first round pick, Ralph Priso, and an undisclosed amount of General Allocation Money in exchange for Mark-Anthony Kaye. In 2023, they traded a 2023 international roster spot, along with Jesús Jiménez in exchange for Brandon Servania.

Transfers
Note: All figures in United States dollars.

In

Transferred In

Loaned in

MLS SuperDraft picks

Out

Transferred out

Loaned out

Pre-season

Matches

Competitions

Major League Soccer

League tables

Eastern Conference

Overall

Matches

2023 Canadian Championship

2023 Leagues Cup

East 3

Competitions summary
{| class="wikitable" style="text-align: center"
|-
!rowspan="2"|Competition
!colspan="8"|Record
!rowspan="2"|First Match
!rowspan="2"|Last Match
!rowspan="2"|Final Position
|-
!
!
!
!
!
!
!
!
|-
| MLS Regular Season

|February 25
|October 21
|
|-
| Canadian Championship

|May 9–11
|TBD
|
|-
| Leagues Cup

|July 26
|TBD
|
|-
! Total

!colspan="4"|

Statistics

Goals 

{| class="wikitable sortable" style="text-align:center;"
|+Goals
!width=15|Rank
!width=15|Nation
!width=130|Player
!width=15|Pos.
!width=50|Major League Soccer
!width=50|MLS Cup Playoffs
!width=50|Canadian Championship
!width=50|Leagues Cup
!width=50|Total
|-
|rowspan=2|1||||Federico Bernardeschi|| RW || 2 || — || 0 || 0 ||2
|-
|||Mark-Anthony Kaye|| MF || 2 || — || 0 || 0 ||2
|-
|rowspan=2|3||||Deandre Kerr|| FW || 1 || — || 0 || 0 ||1
|-
|||Jonathan Osorio|| MF || 1 || — || 0 || 0 ||1
|-
|colspan="4"|Own goals
| 0 || — || 0 || 0 ||0
|- class="sortbottom"
! colspan="4"|Totals||6|| —||0||0 ||6

Shutouts 
{| class="wikitable sortable" style="text-align:center;"
|-
!width=15|Rank
!width=15|Nation
!width=130|Player
!width=15|Pos.
!width=50|Major League Soccer
!width=50|MLS Cup Playoffs
!width=50|Canadian Championship
!width=50|Leagues Cup
!width=50|Total
|-
|1||||Sean Johnson|| GK || 1 || — || 0 || 0 ||1
|-
! colspan="4"|Totals||1||—||0||0||1

References

Notes

External links

Toronto FC seasons
Toronto FC
Toronto